An Arab is a member of the Arabic speaking nations in the Middle East and North Africa. It can also refer to someone who has citizenship of another country but is of Arab descent.

Arab, Arabic, Ərəb or Arap may also refer to:

Language and writing 
 Arab (etymology)
 Arabic alphabet
 Arabic (Unicode block)
 Arabic language
 Varieties of Arabic
 Arabic numerals
 Arabic script

Places

Azerbaijan
Ərəb, Agdash, Azerbaijan
Ərəb, Khachmaz, Azerbaijan
Ərəb, Masally, Azerbaijan
Ərəb Qubalı, Azerbaijan
Ərəb Yengicə, Azerbaijan

Iran
Arab, Iran, a village in North Khorasan Province, Iran
Arab, Firuzabad, a village in Fars Province. Iran
Arab, South Khorasan, a village in South Khorasan Province, Iran

United States
Arab, Alabama, United States
Arab, Missouri, United States

People
 Arap, a clan of the Somali Isaaq clan family
 Arab (born Abrahim Mustafa), an American rapper, a member of S.O.D. Money Gang Inc. alongside Soulja Boy and JBar
Leila Arab (born 1971), an Iranian-born and London-based recording artist, producer and DJ
Mohamed Arab (born 1948), Egyptian politician

Biology
Arabian horse, often called an "Arab" within the equestrian community
araB, a bacterial gene promoter
Colotis, a genus of butterflies sometimes referred to as the Arabs
Gum arabic

Sports
Arab (horse), a British Thoroughbred racehorse foaled in 1824
Arabs, the nickname for the fans of Dundee United Football Club

Transport
Arab (automobile), a 1920s British car
Arab class gunvessel, a 19th-century class of Royal Navy gunboat
Sunbeam Arab, a British World War I-era aircraft engine

Ships
 Arab, a 484 or 485 ton copper sheathed ship (originally 415 ton) built at Stockton in 1840 and chartered by the New Zealand Company 
, the name of seven ships of the Royal Navy
, multiple ships
, a British passenger ship sunk by a German submarine in 1915
, a German-built passenger liner, operated by the British White Star Line after World War 1

Entertainment
The Arabs, backing band of reggae musician Prince Far I
"Arabic", a song by the British punk band Gang of Four (band)
 The Arab (1915 film), directed by Cecil B. DeMille
 The Arab (1924 film), directed by Rex Ingram
 Arab Money, a song by Busta Rhymes

Other uses
Amateur Radio Association of Bahrain
The Arab (magazine), a Middle-Eastern affairs online magazine
Arabs (book), a 2019 book of non-fiction
Arab (number), transliteration of the Hindi term for one billion in the Indian numbering system
Arab Udupi, a brand of restaurants in the UAE

See also
Arabia (disambiguation)
Arabian (disambiguation)
Arabistan (disambiguation)